Dattagalli is a residential area on the southeast of the city of Mysore, the second largest city in the state of Karnataka, India.

Location

Dattagalli is situated around the outer ring road and it is near to Kuvempu Nagar and Andolana Circle. Mysore Airport is 10 km away from Dattagalli. Some famous landmarks here are SaRa Convention Hall, More Supermarket & Nalapak Restaurant.

Education
There are three prominent schools in this area, the Kautilya Vidyalaya,Christ public school and the Supreme Public School. One Ayurvedic Hospital is also situated in Dattagalli.

See also
 
 
 Bogadi
 Ramakrishna Nagar
 Kuvempu Nagar

Image Gallery

Mysore South
Suburbs of Mysore